The Earth of Marvel Comics' main continuity (or "Earth-616") has contained a number of fictional hidden native humanoid races.

Description
Many of these races are genetic offshoots of Homo sapiens or a related ancestor. However, there are also some races that were actually created from the many animals or other lifeforms on Earth. The methods to create these beings vary from scientific to magical and their creators from aliens to humans to demons. A list of these races includes:

Major races

Deviants
The Deviants are the enemies of the Eternals and creations of the Celestials. They are the creators of the Subterraneans.

Eternals
The Eternals  are the enemies of the Deviants and servants of the Celestials. They also created the Evolutionaries.

Evolutionaries
The Evolutionaries are beings created from the Ape-Man by the Eternals to safeguard other species' evolutionary path.

Homo mermanus
Homo mermanus is a species of aquatic humanoids of unknown origins. There are two versions of them:

Atlanteans
The Atlanteans are a race of people that come from Atlantis.

Lemurians
The Lemurians are a race of beings that come from Lemuria.

Inhumans
The Inhumans are an altered superhuman race created by the Kree as a way to restart their own evolution and to create weapons against the Skrulls.

Alpha Primitives
The Alpha Primitives are a slave race created from humans by the Inhumans using the Xerogen Crystals' gas.

Bird People
The Bird-People are a genetic offshoot of the Inhumans with bird wings and, in some cases, bat wings.

Mutants
The Mutants are an evolving superhuman race sometimes termed Homo superior.

Changeling (Mutant version)
The Changelings are a sub-class of Mutants that possess their powers since birth.

Cheyarafim
The Cheyarafim are a group of "angelic" Mutants and enemies of the Neyaphem.

Externals
The Externals are a group of immortal Mutants with god-like powers.

Lupine
The Lupine are a possible subspecies of Mutants that evolved from canines; also known as the "Dominant Species."

Morlocks
The Morlocks are a genetically altered offshoots of Mutants who live underground.

Neo
The Neo are a subspecies of Mutants with superior power and physical abilities.

Neyaphem
The Neyaphem are a group of "demonic" Mutants and enemies of the Cheyarafim.

Savage Land Races
The Savage Land Races are the different races and tribes of Beast Men living in the Savage Land.

Subterraneans
The Subterraneans are races of creatures that live in Subterranea.

Deviant Mutates
The Deviant Mutates are mutated or deformed members of the Deviants.

Ghouls
The Ghouls are a Subterranean race of unknown origins.

Gortokians
The Gortokians are a race of Subterraneans.

Lava Men
The Lava Men are a humanoid race of lava-skinned beings that live in Subterranea.

Lava Men in other media
The Lava Men appear in Marvel Heroes.

Lizard Men of Subterranea
The Lizard Men of Subterranea are a race of humanoid lizards that live in Subterranea.

Molans
The Molans are a race of Subterraneans created by the Deviants.

Moloids
The Moloids are a race of Subterraneans created by the Deviants that are often seen working for the Mole Man.

Moloids in other media
 The Moloids appear in the Fantastic Four episode "Menace of the Mole Man".
 The Moloids appear in The New Fantastic Four episode "Mole Man".
 The Moloids appear in the Fantastic Four: World's Greatest Heroes episode "De-Mole-ition". This version of the Moloids are fungus-like creatures.
 The Moloids appear in the Hulk and the Agents of S.M.A.S.H. episode "Of Moles and Men". They are shown to be led by a Moloid Shaman (voiced by Grey DeLisle).
 The Moloids appear in Marvel Heroes.

Netherworlders
The Netherworlders are a humanoid race from the Netherworld, a city beneath the earth with ties to Atlantis and Lemuria.

Tyrannoids
The Tyrannoids are an offshoot of the Moloids that work for Tyrannus.

Vampires
The Vampires are a race of bloodsucking entities with many types and origins.

Warpies
The Warpies are a race of mutated and unstable beings created by the reality manipulations of Mad Jim Jaspers.

Werewolves
The Werewolves are a race of shapeshifting creatures that transform into wolf-like creatures under the full moon, with some of them being magical in nature, while others are "scientific".

Zombies
The Zombies are a race of 'the living dead' with many types and origins ranging from magical to artificial.

Other races

Bird-Men of Akah Ma'at
The Bird-Men of Akah Ma'at are humanoid beings with bird wings from the Hyborian Age and enemies of Ur-Xanarrh. They were created by Oshtur.

Cat People
The Cat People are a race of humanoid cats created by magic and are apparently now extinct on Earth. The race had a hand in the origin of Tigra.

A similar but unconnected alien race of Cat People, this time from the Land Within, encountered Morbius the Living Vampire.

Changelings (Woodgod's version)
The Changelings are human-animal hybrids created by a being named Woodgod using genetic engineering.

Children of the Sun
The Children of the Sun are humanoid beings created by Ex Nihilo.

Children of the Vault
The Children of the Vault are a group of superhuman beings that evolved from baseline humanity and separated from Mutants.

Descendants
The Descendants are humanoid cybernetic sapient beings created by science and the magic of the Orb of Necromancy.

Fish People
The Fish People are an offshoot of humanity that live and breathe under water.

Infra-Worlders
The Infra-Worlders are humans that "evolved" to live and withstand the pressure beneath the ocean.

Man-Bats of Ur-Xanarrh
The Man-Bats of Ur-Xanarrh are humanoid beings with bat wings from the Hyborian Age and enemies of Akah Ma'at. They were created by the demon Chthon.

Man-Serpents
The Man-Serpents are a race of beings with serpent bodies and human heads created by the demon Set. They are related to the Serpent Men.

New Men
The New Men are a race of mutated and evolved animals created by the High Evolutionary.

Outcasts
There are two versions of Outcasts:

Outcasts (gamma version)
The Outcasts are a group of desert animals and plants who became susceptible to Bruce Banner's gamma radiation.

Outcasts (Subterranean version)
The Outcasts are groups of beings who were granted powers by the Mole Man.

Sasquatch
The Sasquatch are a legendary race also known as Bigfoot.

Saur-Lords
The Saur-Lords are a group of genetically altered dinosaurs created by the High Technician.

Seal People
The Seal People are a race of humanoid seals and enemies of Atlantis.

Shark Men
The Shark Men are a race of humanoid sharks that live in the oceans of the world. They were a race of ancient aquatic people who were transformed into this state by the Old Ones.

Serpent Men
The Serpent Men are a race of humanoid reptilians with snake-like heads created by the demon Set. They are related to the Man-Serpents.

Spider-People
The Spider-People are a race of humanoid beings with spider-like characteristics. They are the children of Omm and the grandchildren of Gaea.

Stygians
The Stygians is a southern race of rock giants, monsters, sorcerers and dark sorcerers from Hyboria.

Troglodytes of Britain
The Troglodytes of Britain  are a group of underground dwellers that are apparently an evolutionary throwback.

Walrus Men
The Walrus Men are a race of humanoid walruses.

Wolf-Men of Valusia
The Wolf-Men of Valusia are a race of lupine shapeshifters similar to werewolves created by the demon Chthon. While the Wolf Men of Valusia are vulnerable to silver like the werewolves, they can change between their human and Wolf-Men forms without the aid of the full moon.

Yeti
Yeti are fur-covered humanoid beings living in the Himalaya Mountains and familiarly known as the "Abominable Snowmen." There are three known varieties of Yeti:

 A far more primitive race of Yeti with human intelligence were killed by an expedition team.
 An example of a race of Yeti was encountered by Shang-Chi during his quest in Tibet.

Cold People
The Cold People (also called the Chosen) are a race of creatures living high in the Himalayas that are often mistaken for Yeti because they have a similar appearance.

References

External links
 

Human-derived fictional species